Loch Loskin is a freshwater loch in Ardnadam, Argyll and Bute, Scotland.  The outflow from the loch is the Milton Burn, which winds its way through Dunoon to the Firth of Clyde. The A885 from Sandbank known as the "High Road" locally passes the loch.

Nature

Fishing
Loch Loskin is stocked with brown trout by Dunoon and District Angling Club.

Loch Loskin Strathspey
The Loch Loskin strathspey was composed by Roderick Campbell.

References

External links

 
 British Lakes Info website
 Dunoon and District Angling Club

Loskin
Loskin
Cowal